Aleksandr Sazankov (born 8 March 1984) is a Belarusian former professional footballer.

External links
 
 
 

1984 births
Living people
Belarusian footballers
Association football forwards
Belarusian expatriate footballers
Expatriate footballers in Poland
Belarus under-21 international footballers
FC Dnepr Mogilev players
FC Dinamo Minsk players
Lechia Gdańsk players
FC Orsha players
FC Gorki players
People from Mogilev
Sportspeople from Mogilev Region